Gąsiorowo  (historical variants Gonziorowen, Gonsoroffen; from 1938-45 Klinken) is a village in the administrative district of Gmina Wieliczki, within Olecko County, Warmian-Masurian Voivodeship, in northern Poland.

References

Villages in Olecko County